The 2006 Macau Open Badminton Championships was the first edition of the Macau Open Badminton Championships. It was held in the Tap Seac Multi-sports Pavilion from July 19 to July 23, 2006, and the prize money was US$120,000.

Medalists

References
tournamentsoftware.com

Macau Open Badminton Championships
Macau Open Badminton Championships
2006 in Macau sport